The 2020 WAC women's basketball tournament was a postseason women's basketball tournament for the Western Athletic Conference during the 2019–20 season. All tournament games was set to play at the Orleans Arena in Paradise, Nevada, from March 11–14, 2020. The tournament champion would have receive the WAC's automatic bid to the 2020 NCAA women's tournament.

Seeds
Eight of the 9 teams in the WAC are eligible to compete in the conference tournament. California Baptist is ineligible due to their transition from Division II to Division I. Teams will be seeded by record within the conference, with a tiebreaker system to seed teams with identical conference records.

Schedule and results

Bracket

References

External links
2020 Western Athletic Conference Men's and Women's Basketball Championships

WAC women's basketball tournament
2019–20 Western Athletic Conference women's basketball season
2020 in sports in Nevada
Basketball competitions in the Las Vegas Valley
College basketball tournaments in Nevada
Women's sports in Nevada
WAC women's basketball tournament
College sports tournaments in Nevada